

Moist, describing the presence of moisture, may refer to:

Music
 Moist (band), a Canadian alternative rock band
 "Moist", a song by Janet Jackson from her 2004 album Damita Jo

People
 Lewis Moist (1881–1940), British Olympic swimmer
 MoistCr1TiKaL, American Youtuber, Twitch streamer and musician
 Paul Moist, Canadian union leader

Other uses
 Moist, a fictional character from Joss Whedon's Dr. Horrible's Sing-Along Blog
 Moist von Lipwig, a fictional character in Terry Pratchett's Discworld series
 Moists (or Mohists), followers of the Chinese philosophy called Mohism (or Moism)

See also